Parasnath railway station, station code PNME, is on the Asansol–Gaya section of the Grand Chord and serves the town of Isri in Giridih district in the Indian state of Jharkhand.

Etymology 
The word Parasnath comes from the 23rd Tirthankara of Jainism, Parshva. Jains refer to the Parasnath Hill as Shikharji, and it is one of the two most prominent Jain pilgrimage centers, the other being Shetrunjaya, in Gujarat. According to Jain belief, twenty of the twenty-four Tirthankaras (teachers of the Jains) attained Moksha (Nirvana) from Shikharji.

History

The Grand Chord was opened in 1906.

Electrification
The Gomoh–Koderma sector was electrified in 1961–62.

Shikharji

It is a holy place to visit with innumerable temples, shrines and meditation halls in the midst of natural scenery and wildlife.

There are two recognized routes to Parasnath Hill. The summit of Parasnath Hill can be reached either from the southern or the northern side.

The northern approach is a  route from Madhuban on the Dumri-Giridih road. Buses ply along this route from Dumri to Giridih and stop at Madhuban village. Hired cars or taxis are available at Isri Bazar, just outside the rail station. There are a number of Jain temples at Madhuban.

Both the Shwetambaras and Digambaras have established Dharamshalas or Ashrams here to accommodate the pilgrims to this the first most holy place for travelers from all over the world. The main hill belongs to the Digambara.

Further extension

There are plans from the Railway ministry to connect Parasnath station with  via Madhuban, for the convenience of the Jain pilgrims visiting Shikharji. The foundation for the construction of new Parasnath–New Giridih rail line was laid in 2019. The 47-km long railway line would incur a cost of Rs 972 crore on its construction and will have two crossing stations and a couple of halts. The cost of the project would be borne by the central and the state government in 50:50 ratio and a target has been set to complete the project by 2023.

References

External links

 Trains passing through Parasnath Station

Railway stations in Giridih district
Dhanbad railway division
Railway stations opened in 1907